João Paulo da Silva Gouveia Morais (born 31 August 1978 in Setúbal), known as João Paulo, is a Portuguese retired footballer who played as a goalkeeper.

External links

1978 births
Living people
Sportspeople from Setúbal
Portuguese footballers
Association football goalkeepers
Primeira Liga players
Segunda Divisão players
C.D. Cova da Piedade players
União Montemor players
Imortal D.C. players
S.C. Braga B players
S.C. Braga players
Atlético Clube de Portugal players
Seixal F.C. players
F.C. Oliveira do Hospital players
GD Beira-Mar players
Vitória F.C. players
F.C. Vizela players
Foolad FC players
Portuguese expatriate footballers
Expatriate footballers in Iran
Portuguese expatriate sportspeople in Iran